Chad Marshall (born August 22, 1984) is an American former professional soccer player. During his 16-year career, he played for Columbus Crew and Seattle Sounders FC in Major League Soccer. He was a three-time MLS Defender of the Year Award winner.

Career

Youth and college
Marshall attended Rubidoux High School in Riverside, California, where he was an NCSAA All-American, Parade All-America selection, and Parades Best Defender in his senior year, and a Parade All-American his junior year. Coming out of high school he was rated as the top college soccer recruit in the country by Soccer America. In addition to his soccer exploits, Chad was also an avid equestrian. He played club soccer for the prestigious club soccer team Irvine Strikers coached by the legendary club coach Don Ebert. He attended the IMG Soccer Academy in fall 2000 through spring 2001. Chad attended Stanford University for two years a brief stint at Harding University. After two seasons with the Cardinal, he decided to turn pro.

Professional

Marshall was drafted second overall in the 2004 MLS SuperDraft by Columbus Crew. He had an exemplary first year, anchoring the Crew defense along with Robin Fraser, who won the MLS Defender of the Year award that season, and helped the team to an eighteen-game unbeaten streak and the MLS Supporters' Shield. He finished the season with twenty-seven starts, and was a close second to Clint Dempsey in the voting for the MLS Rookie of the Year Award. He only played in twelve matches in 2007 due to ongoing concussion issues that threatened to end his career.

Marshall's strongest campaign with the Crew came in 2008. He led the defense on the squad that won both the Supporters' Shield and the MLS Cup 2008, a game in which Marshall scored the game-winning goal. After the season, he was voted to the MLS Best XI and was also awarded the MLS Defender of the Year award, beating competition from Bakary Soumare and Jimmy Conrad.

Marshall's contract ran out after the 2008 campaign. After a brief trial for part of December with German 2. Fußball-Bundesliga side Mainz 05 he re-signed with Columbus on December 26, 2008.

On March 17, 2011, Marshall was named captain of Columbus Crew for the 2011 season to fill the void left by departing captain Frankie Hejduk. In December 2011, Columbus signed Marshall to a long-term contract extension through the 2015 MLS season.

On December 12, 2013, Marshall was traded to Seattle Sounders FC in exchange for allocation money and a third-round 2015 MLS SuperDraft pick. He scored his first goal as a Sounder, a game-winning header in the 84th minute, against the Philadelphia Union on May 3. He was named MLS Defender of the Year for the third time as the Sounders won the Supporters Shield.

On May 22, 2019, Marshall announced his retirement from professional soccer due to injury, concluding a historic 16-year Major League Soccer career at age 34.

International
As a teenager, Marshall trained at the United States Soccer Federation's exclusive Bradenton Academy and has played for several United States youth national teams. He played for the United States at the 2003 FIFA World Youth Championship, now commonly known as the FIFA U-20 World Cup, in the United Arab Emirates. He later moved up and earned time with the Under-23 team.

Marshall earned his first cap and scored his first goal for the senior national team on March 9, 2005, against Colombia. Marshall was selected for the 2009 CONCACAF Gold Cup for the United States and received his first cap since 2005 in the side's opening match against Grenada. Marshall went on to play in five games throughout the tournament and garnered Gold Cup All-Tournament honors.

On May 11, 2010, Bob Bradley, the U.S. Men's National Team head coach selected Marshall for the 30-man preliminary roster for the 2010 FIFA World Cup.
On May 26, 2010, Bradley decided to keep Marshall off the 23 man roster for the 2010 FIFA World Cup.

On January 6, 2017, after almost seven years of absence from international soccer, Marshall was called for the United States national team by coach Bruce Arena.

Career statistics
Club statistics

International goals

Honors

Columbus CrewMLS Cup (1): 2008MLS Supporters' Shield (3): 2004, 2008, 2009

Seattle Sounders FCMLS Cup (2): 2016, 2019MLS Supporters' Shield (1): 2014U.S. Open Cup (1): 2014

IndividualMLS Defender of the Year: 2008, 2009, 2014MLS Best XI': 2008, 2009, 2014, 2018
 CONCACAF Gold Cup All-Tournament Team: 2009

References

External links
 
 

1984 births
Living people
American soccer players
Harding University alumni
Soccer players from Riverside, California
Stanford Cardinal men's soccer players
Columbus Crew players
Seattle Sounders FC players
United States men's youth international soccer players
United States men's under-20 international soccer players
United States men's under-23 international soccer players
United States men's international soccer players
Columbus Crew draft picks
2009 CONCACAF Gold Cup players
Major League Soccer players
Major League Soccer All-Stars
Association football defenders